Bouïra District is a district of Bouïra Province, Algeria.

Municipalities
The district is further divided into 3 municipalities:
Bouïra
Aïn Turk 
Aït Laziz

Districts of Bouïra Province